Grace Lee (Lee Kyung-hee) is a South Korean-born Filipino film distributor, businesswoman, former television host and former radio disc jockey.  She is one of a few Korean expatriates to appear prominently in Philippine television, other notable expatriates are Sandara Park, Ryan Bang and Sam Oh. In 2015, she left the country to go back home to her native country and serve there.  She can speak Tagalog and English in addition to her native Korean.

Biography

Early life
Lee was born and raised in Seoul, but moved to the Philippines at the age of 10 because of her father's business, which involved importing Korean cars.  She studied from second grade to fourth year high school at St. Paul College in Pasig and graduated from Ateneo de Manila University, where she obtained her Communication Arts degree.  Before becoming a TV host, she had been hosting events for Korean-Filipino communities as well as being an official interpreter for Malacañang.

Career
Lee planned on becoming a journalist. She sent her résumé to major television studios in the Philippines and received a callback from GMA Network.  She landed her first Philippine TV hosting job in March 2007 as a segment host on Q-11’s lifestyle-magazine show The Sweet Life. Among her first assignments include featuring life in Korea where she gets to wear traditional female garb as well as interviewing prominent Korean celebrities such as Yoon Se Ah of Lovers in Prague and King Sejong the Great drama series.

She stayed with Magic 89.9 from 2007 up to 2012 co-hosting the morning radio show Good Times with Mo with Mo Twister and Mojo Jojo as a replacement for Andi-9.  Lee is also a Manila correspondent for YTN in Korea, as well as teaching at the Manila New Life Church's Sunday school for preschool students and takes part in various outreach programs.

Lee was added as an anchor of "Silip Showbiz" (a segment of News on Q) and then hosted a cooking reality show, Eateria that aired every Sunday mornings on GMA Network. Lee also hosted Diz Iz It! that aired 6 days a week on GMA. She was also a guest segment anchor both for Balitanghali on GMA News TV during weekdays (2011–present), and 24 Oras Weekend Edition during Saturdays on GMA.

In August 2012, Lee left GMA Network and moved to TV5. Upon her arrival on TV5, she was joined by Martin Andanar as co-anchor on Andar ng mga Balita on AksyonTV and also joined Good Morning Club.

In January 2013, Lee became a co-host on TV5's noontime variety show, Wowowillie, with main host Willie Revillame and also became an anchor for Aksyon Weekend, alongside Raffy Tulfo during Saturday nights.

From July 2014 until 2015, she became an early morning news anchor in the first of four editions of Aksyon, Aksyon sa Umaga alongside Martin Andanar, Lourd de Veyra, Erwin Tulfo, Cheryl Cosim and Atty. Melencio Santa Maria. From then on, she went inactive on-screen.

In 2019, Lee established Glimmer Productions, a Philippine-based company focusing on distributing Korean films and aims to produce original content, with the 2022 South Korean crime-action film The Roundup as its first "big outing" as a production company. Prior to the COVID pandemic, she had plans to showcase Korean-Filipino film and live entertainment projects, but those projects would be stalled until 2022. Apart from film distribution, she thrives in her Korean food business venture.

Personal life
Lee was once in a relationship with Benigno Aquino III, the 15th president of the Philippines. She admitted to the relationship on her show stating in response to the president's claim of their relationship, "what the president said is true".

Filmography

TV shows

Radio shows

References

Year of birth missing (living people)
Living people
South Korean expatriates in the Philippines
Ateneo de Manila University alumni
People from Seoul
South Korean television presenters
South Korean women television presenters
GMA Network personalities
GMA Integrated News and Public Affairs people
TV5 (Philippine TV network) personalities
News5 people